
Jędrzejów County is a unit of territorial administration and local government (powiat) in Świętokrzyskie Voivodeship, south-central Poland. It came into being on January 1, 1999, as a result of the Polish local government reforms passed in 1998.

As of 2019 its total population is 84,049, out of which the population of Jędrzejów is 15,076, that of Sędziszów is 6,451, that of Małogoszcz is 3,748, and the rural population is 58,774.

Neighbouring counties
Jędrzejów County is bordered by Kielce County to the north-east, Pińczów County to the south-east, Miechów County to the south, Zawiercie County to the west and Włoszczowa County to the north-west.

Administrative division
The county is subdivided into nine gminas (three urban-rural and six rural). These are listed in the following table, in descending order of population.

References

 
Land counties of Świętokrzyskie Voivodeship